"Divine Hammer" is a song by American alternative rock band the Breeders, released as the second single from their second album, Last Splash (1993), in October 1993.

Meaning 
Lead vocalist Kim Deal said: "It's about existential angst, really. I'm just looking for some divinity come down and, you know what, I don't think there is anything. I don't use syringe drugs, but you could use drugs to find your divine your divinity. Christian songs, they use all of these things... if you go around the mountain, and if you work hard with the hammer, and you meet a carpenter called Jesus Christ, and you travel miles and miles... all these stupid symbolisms that Christian folk groups will use."

Track listing 

"Divine Hammer" is a different version than the LP version, and "Do You Love Me Now Jr?" is an alternate version of the LP version featuring J Mascis on backing vocals.

Music video 
The music video for Divine Hammer was directed by Spike Jonze, Kim Gordon, and Richard Kern.

Charts

Notes

References 

 
 
 
 
 
 
 
 
 
 

The Breeders songs
1993 singles
Music videos directed by Spike Jonze
Songs written by Kim Deal
4AD singles
1993 songs
Music videos directed by Richard Kern